is a Japanese regional cuisine of the city of Nagoya and surrounding region in central Japan. Due to differences in culture, historical contact between other regions, climate, vegetables and other ingredients, Nagoya cuisine has unique features. Although many dishes derived from local tradition, Nagoya cuisine has been inspired by  foreign cuisines such as Italian cuisine, Taiwanese cuisine, Indian cuisine, and mainland Chinese cuisine. 

Nagoya cuisine is  typically seasoned with mame miso or tamari, the type of soy sauce made mainly in the Chūbu region. These condiments give strong taste to Nagoya cuisine.

Nagoya kōchin is traditional ingredient of Nagoya cuisine. Shrimp is another specialty.

Dishes inspired by foreign food, like  various local spaghetti dishes and "Taiwanese" noodles  has become an increasingly significant part of Nagoya cuisine.

Local dishes include: 
 Tebasaki: chicken wings marinated in a sweet sauce with sesame seeds, basically a type of yakitori.
 Kishimen: flat udon noodles with a slippery texture, dipped in a light soy sauce soup and a sliced leek or other flavouring added. It can be eaten cold or hot.
 Red miso: various dishes that use red miso, such as miso katsu (pork cutlet with sweet miso sauce), miso nikomi udon (hard udon stewed in miso soup), miso oden (miso taste oden, a type of stew), and dote nabe (miso nabemono with meat and vegetables).
 Ogura toast: Toast spread with ogura bean jam and butter that originated in Nagoya and is commonly served in Aichi prefecture cafés.
 Hitsumabushi: rice dish with unagi in a lidded wooden container. This dish is enjoyed three ways; as unadon, with spice and as chazuke.
 Nagoya kōchin: a special breed of free-range chicken that has been cross-bred between a Nagoya chicken and a cochin. The time until maturity is 2.5 times that of broiler chicken and its meat is juicy and tender, without a strong scent. 
 Toriwasa: Sashimi made of Nagoya kōchin, from the flesh, liver, heart and gizzard. 
 Uirō: rice dumpling made by mixing rice flour with sugar and then steaming the mixture. The name is said to have come from a Chinese medicine that resembled it in colour. It is assumed that the medicine was brought by Chinese medicine vendors to Japan before the 15th century.
 Tenmusu: rice ball wrapped in nori with tempura at the centre. This dish originated in Tsu and became popular in Nagoya.
 Moriguchizuke: pickles made of Moriguchi daikon. The radish, about one and a half metres long and two centimetres in diameter, is pickled in barrels of sake and other seasoning. The radish is so long that you have to pack them along the inner wall of the barrel, one on top of the other.

Gallery

References

External links 
 
 Nagoya-meshi Promotion Association

Culture in Nagoya
Japanese cuisine